Guo Wenjun (born June 22, 1984 in Xi'an, Shaanxi) is a female Chinese sport shooter who won three of the four gold medals in women's pistol shooting during the European part of the 2008 ISSF World Cup. She won gold in the women's 10 metre air pistol at the 2008 Summer Olympics and 2012 Summer Olympics. She is the only woman to have defended women's 10 metre air pistol title at the Olympic Games.

See also 
 China at the 2012 Summer Olympics

References

External links
 Official Profile at 2008teamchina.olympic.cn
 
 

1984 births
Living people
Chinese female sport shooters
ISSF pistol shooters
Olympic gold medalists for China
Olympic shooters of China
Sportspeople from Xi'an
Shooters at the 2008 Summer Olympics
Shooters at the 2012 Summer Olympics
Shooters at the 2016 Summer Olympics
Asian Games medalists in shooting
Olympic medalists in shooting
Medalists at the 2012 Summer Olympics
Medalists at the 2008 Summer Olympics
Shooters at the 2006 Asian Games
Shooters at the 2010 Asian Games
Shooters at the 2014 Asian Games
Asian Games gold medalists for China
Asian Games silver medalists for China
Asian Games bronze medalists for China
Medalists at the 2006 Asian Games
Medalists at the 2010 Asian Games
Medalists at the 2014 Asian Games
Sport shooters from Shaanxi
20th-century Chinese women
21st-century Chinese women